Gregory Alan Lewis Jr. (born February 12, 1980) is an American football coach and former player. He is the wide receivers coach for the Baltimore Ravens of the National Football League (NFL). He played wide receiver in the NFL for eight seasons. After playing college football for Illinois, he was signed by the Philadelphia Eagles as an undrafted free agent in 2003. He played for the Eagles for six seasons from 2003 to 2008 and the Minnesota Vikings for two seasons from 2009 to 2010. Lewis has served as assistant coach for the University of San Diego, San Jose State, Pittsburgh Panthers, Eagles, and Chiefs.

Early years
Lewis attended Rich South High School in Richton Park, Illinois, which retired his No. 8 jersey in 2004.

College career
Lewis went to the University of Illinois, joining the football team as a walk-on.

Professional career

Philadelphia Eagles
After going undrafted in the 2003 NFL Draft, Lewis signed with the Philadelphia Eagles as an undrafted free agent. Limited to mostly special teams his rookie season, Lewis worked his way into the receivers rotation his second year, helping the Eagles reach Super Bowl XXXIX. He caught a 30-yard touchdown in the fourth quarter to bring the Eagles within 3, but the Eagles would go on to lose the game.

Lewis spent six seasons with the Eagles, playing in 99 games with 24 starts between the regular season and playoffs, while recording 136 receptions for 1,879 yards and eight touchdowns.

New England Patriots
Lewis was acquired via trade along with a 2010 7th-round draft pick by the New England Patriots in exchange for a 2009 5th-round draft pick on March 5, 2009. Coach Bill Belichick had considered drafting Lewis in 2003, and Lewis had career games against the Patriots in the Super Bowl, and in 2007 when the Eagles nearly ended the Patriots undefeated streak. However, he was released on September 5 during finals cuts.

Minnesota Vikings
Lewis signed with the Minnesota Vikings on September 10, 2009. This reunited him with Vikings coach Brad Childress, who previously served as offensive coordinator for the Eagles.

On September 27, 2009, Lewis caught a contested 32-yard touchdown pass from quarterback Brett Favre while falling out of the back of the end zone with two seconds remaining to give the Vikings a dramatic come-from-behind 27-24 victory over the San Francisco 49ers. It was Lewis' first catch with the team and the game marked his debut as a Viking (he was inactive for the previous two games). He received an ESPY Award for Best Play along with Favre.

He was re-signed to a one-year contract on February 28, 2010.

Coaching career
Lewis was a coaching intern for the Eagles during the rookie mini-camp in 2012. For the 2012 season under head coach Ron Caragher, Lewis was wide receivers coach for the University of San Diego Toreros football team that went 8-3 with the top 3 receivers going for 144 catches and 15 of the team's 20 touchdown passes. Caragher became head coach at San Jose State University in 2013, and Lewis joined Caragher's staff in San Jose State as wide receivers coach. On February 19, 2014, Lewis was named the receivers coach at the University of Pittsburgh by head coach Paul Chryst. After spending the 2015 season with the New Orleans Saints of the NFL as an offensive assistant, Lewis was hired by the Eagles as the team's wide receivers coach on January 20, 2016 and released on January 9, 2017. Lewis was hired as the Kansas City Chiefs' wide receiver coach in January 2017. In 2019, Lewis won his first Super Bowl when the Chiefs defeated the San Francisco 49ers 31-20 in Super Bowl LIV. He was reassigned to be the Chiefs' running backs coach on April 2, 2021. In Week 1 of the 2021 NFL season, Lewis started a physical altercation when he pushed Cleveland Browns player Ronnie Harrison who was standing over Kansas City Chiefs player Clyde Edwards-Helaire.   Lewis was later fined an undisclosed amount by the league. In 2022, Lewis won his second Super Bowl when the Chiefs defeated the Philadelphia Eagles 38-35 in Super Bowl LVII.

References

External links
Baltimore Ravens bio

1980 births
Living people
Sportspeople from Chicago
Players of American football from Chicago
American football wide receivers
Illinois Fighting Illini football players
Philadelphia Eagles players
Philadelphia Eagles coaches
Minnesota Vikings players
New Orleans Saints coaches
San Diego Toreros football coaches
San Jose State Spartans football coaches
Pittsburgh Panthers football coaches
New England Patriots players
Kansas City Chiefs coaches
Baltimore Ravens coaches